Marian Gobius (2 March 1910 – 11 December 1994) was a Dutch sculptor. Her work was part of the art competitions at the 1932 Summer Olympics and the 1936 Summer Olympics.

References

1910 births
1994 deaths
20th-century Dutch sculptors
Dutch women sculptors
Olympic competitors in art competitions
People from Haarlem
20th-century Dutch women